Ouédogo-Bokin, also written Ouedogo Bokin, Ouedogo-bokin, Ouedogo-Bokin or Ouedogo boken and also simply called Boken, is a commune in the Gounghin Department of Kouritenga Province in the Centre-Est region of Burkina Faso. It had a population of 1,407 in 2006.

Demographics

Neighbourhoods

References 

Populated places in the Centre-Est Region